Charanjit Kumar is a former Indian hockey player. He was part of the Indian hockey team that won the gold medal in 1980 Summer Olympics at Moscow. He was part of the Indian hockey team in 1984 Olympics

References

External links
 

Year of birth missing (living people)
Olympic field hockey players of India
Olympic gold medalists for India
Field hockey players at the 1980 Summer Olympics
Field hockey players at the 1984 Summer Olympics
Living people
Olympic medalists in field hockey
Indian male field hockey players
Medalists at the 1980 Summer Olympics
Asian Games medalists in field hockey
Field hockey players at the 1982 Asian Games
Asian Games silver medalists for India
Medalists at the 1982 Asian Games